Alien8 Recordings is an independent record label founded in 1996 in Montreal, Quebec, Canada. The label was founded by Sean O'Hara and Gary Worsley.

The label released material from prominent noise artists such as Merzbow, Think About Life, Aube, Keiji Haino, Masonna, MSBR, Francisco López, Bastard Noise, and Daniel Menche, as well as electronic artists such as Tim Hecker, Lesbians on Ecstasy, Les Georges Leningrad, and Books on Tape. Alien8 also is known for releasing the 2003 debut of indie-pop band The Unicorns. It also had two sub-labels, Fancy Recordings and Substractif, which released music from 2001 to 2004.

In 2018, Worsley bought Montreal's famed record store Cheap Thrills, where he had been working since 1998.

Alien8 has not released any music since 2011. The last post on its website is dated December 2012. The website went offline in 2022.

Discography

See also 
 List of record labels

References

External links
 Official website

 
Record labels established in 1996
Quebec record labels
Canadian independent record labels
Noise music record labels
Experimental music record labels